The New York State Gaming Commission is the official governing body that oversees casino gaming, charitable gaming, horse racing, lottery, and video lottery terminals in New York State. Based in Schenectady, it was formed on February 1, 2013, upon the merger of the New York State Racing and Wagering Board, and the New York Lottery. It is part of the New York State Executive Department.

As of June 2021, the members of the commission are:
 Barry Sample, Chair
 John A. Crotty
 Peter J. Moschetti, Jr.
 John J. Poklemba
 Jerry Skurnik
 Christopher Riano

The Executive Director of the Commission is Robert Williams, who was formerly in charge of the state lottery division.

In January 2022 a new state law in New York went into effect banning the slaughter of race horses in New York. The law also requires racehorses and breed horses to be microchipped.

See also
 New York Racing Association

References

External links
 
 

Government agencies established in 2013
Gambling regulators in the United States
Horse racing organizations in the United States
Gaming Commission
2013 establishments in New York (state)
Schenectady, New York
Gambling in New York (state)